Khandelwal Vaishya is a Marwari trading community (Baniya) originally from Khandela, a historical town in northern Rajasthan, India. Khandelwals are mainly present around districts of Jaipur, Dausa, Sikar, Alwar, Bharatpur and Ajmer.

Origin 
The Khandelwal community traces its origin and name from Khandela, a town in Sikar district. They believe their name derives from a sage called Khandel, whose 72 1/2 sons started the 72 1/2 gotras (clans) into which the community is divided. Each clan worships its own kuldevi. These Gotras are subdivision of the community.

References 

Social groups of Rajasthan
Bania communities
People from Sikar district